Akshi is a 2021 Indian Kannada-language film written and directed by Manoj Kumar. Srinivas V. has produced and Kalaadegula Srinivas scored the music. The film explores the importance of eye donation. Akshi was awarded the National Film Award for Best Feature Film in Kannada.

Cast
 Govinde Gowda.
 Ila Vitla
 Kalaadegula Srinivas
 Master Mithun
 Kumari Sowmya Prabhu
 Nagaraj Rao
 Kasturi Mulimani

Production
Akshi is first film for the producer Kalaadegula Srinivas. He is one among the popular Kannada anchor's in Karnataka, music director, singer, actor, dubbing & voice over artist . The film was supposed to be released in 2020 itself due to COVID-19 the movie will have a delayed-release.

Accolades
67th National Film Awards - 2019 Best Feature Film in Kannada

References

External links
 Official Page for Directorate of Film Festivals, India
 National Film Awards Archives

2021 films
Films set in Karnataka
2020s Kannada-language films
Films shot in Karnataka
Films postponed due to the COVID-19 pandemic
Best Kannada Feature Film National Film Award winners
Indian drama films